Midori (which means green in Japanese) was the code name for a managed code operating system (OS) being developed by Microsoft with joint effort of Microsoft Research. It had been reported to be a possible commercial implementation of the OS Singularity, a research project begun in 2003 to build a highly dependable OS in which the kernel, device drivers, and application software are all written in managed code. It was designed for concurrency, and could run a program spread across multiple nodes at once. It also featured a security model that sandboxes applications for increased security. Microsoft had mapped out several possible migration paths from Windows to Midori. Midori was discontinued some time in 2015, though many of its concepts were used in other Microsoft projects.

History 
The code name Midori was first discovered through the PowerPoint presentation CHESS: A systematic testing tool for concurrent software.

Another reference to Midori was found in a presentation shown during the Object-Oriented Programming, Systems, Languages & Applications (OOPSLA) October 2012 conference, and a paper from the conference's proceedings.

References

External links
 SD Times' David Worthington on the migration away from Windows
 SD Times' David Worthington on Midori security
 Technologizer report by David Worthington on Windows Mobile's life cycle
 Microsoft sees end of Windows era, BBC News
 Joe Duffy - Blogging about Midori, 2015

Microsoft operating systems
Microsoft Research
Microkernel-based operating systems
Capability systems
Microkernels